The Kolyma Mountains or Kolyma Upland is a system of mountain ranges in northeastern Siberia, lying mostly within the Magadan Oblast, along the shores of the Sea of Okhotsk in the Kolyma region.

Geography
To the west and southwest the Upper Kolyma Highlands are bound by the Seymchan-Buyunda Depression to the north and the Ola river basin to the south. The Yukaghir Highlands, highest point Mount Chubukulakh, rise to the northwest, the Anadyr Highlands to the north and northeast and the Koryak Highlands to the east.

Subranges
Besides the Omsukchan Range, the system of the Kolyma Mountains comprises a number of subranges. Most are located in Magadan Oblast:

Korkodon Range, highest point  
Kongin Range, highest point 
Molkaty Range, highest point 
Kilgan Massif, highest point  
Maymandzhin Range, highest point  
Kedon Range, highest point 
Molongdin Range, highest point  (the eastern end is in Kamchatka Krai)

The northernmost ranges are located in the Chukotka Autonomous Okrug
Kuryin Range (курьинский кряж), highest point 
Oloy Range, highest point 
Ush-Urekchen, highest point

Hydrography
Many right tributaries of the Kolyma River have their sources in the northern and northwestern slopes of the Kolima Highlands, including the Bakhapcha, Buyunda, Balygychan, Sugoy, Korkodon —with its tributary Bulun, and the Omolon —with its tributaries Molongda, Oloy, Kedon and Kegali. 
The rivers originating in the southern and southeastern slopes of the mountain area flow into the Sea of Okhotsk and are shorter: Ola, Yama, Gizhiga, Paren and Penzhina.

References

External links

Stone glaciers of the Kolyma Highlands 

 
East Siberian Mountains